Bert Mooney Airport  is a public airport three miles southeast of Butte, in Silver Bow County, Montana, United States. It is owned by the Bert Mooney Airport Authority.

The airport name was changed in 1972 to honor Bert Mooney, an aviator from Butte who was the first to fly mail into Yellowstone National Park in 1935. Prior to this the airport was Butte Municipal Airport (from its opening in 1926) and Silver Bow County Airport from 1960 to 1972.

The National Plan of Integrated Airport Systems for 2011–2015 categorized it as a primary commercial service facility (more than 10,000 enplanements per year). Federal Aviation Administration records say the airport had 30,431 passenger boardings (enplanements) in calendar year 2008, 25,178 in 2009 and 25,433 in 2010.

Facilities
Bert Mooney Airport covers 890 acres (360 ha) at an elevation of 5,550 feet (1,692 m). It has two asphalt runways: 15/33 is 9,001 by 150 feet (2,744 x 46 m) and 11/29 is 5,100 by 75 feet.

In 2011 the airport had 23,934 aircraft operations, average 65 per day: 86% general aviation, 8% air taxi, 3% commercial service and 3% military. 36 aircraft were then based at this airport: 67% single-engine, 25% multi-engine, and 8% helicopter.

Airlines and Destinations

Passenger

Accidents
On November 7, 1950, a Northwest Orient Airlines plane carrying 21 people crashed into the East Ridge of Butte during a blizzard. All on board were killed.

On March 22, 2009, a Pilatus PC-12 flying in from Oroville, California, crashed in Holy Cross Cemetery 500 feet from the airport, killing all 14 passengers and crew on board.

References

External links
 Bert Mooney Airport, official site
 
 

Airports in Montana
Buildings and structures in Butte, Montana
Transportation in Silver Bow County, Montana
Airports established in 1926
Essential Air Service
1926 establishments in Montana